was a Japanese samurai of the Sengoku Period, who most notably served the Oda clan. He was born in Mino Province, and first served the Saitō clan. After the fall of the Saitō, he was taken on as a retainer by Oda Nobunaga. 

He was particularly active during the time of Oda Nobunaga's entry into Kyoto. In late 1568, Masahisa joined Shibata Katsuie, Hosokawa Fujitaka, Hachiya Yoritaka, and Mori Yoshinari in attacking Iwanari Tomomichi's Shōryūji Castle.

Later in 1570, at Battle of Anegawa while under attack from Asai forces under Isono Kazumasa, he lost his son Sakai Kyūzō. 

Masahisa was also present at the Siege of Odani 1573. Masahisa died soon after, at the Battle of Katada. Family headship was thus inherited by his second son, Sakai Etchū no kami.

References
 Papinot, Edmond. Historical and Geographical Dictionary of Japan
  page.sannet.ne.jp
 Naramoto Tatsuya (1994). Nihon no Kassen: Monoshiri Jiten. Tokyo: Shufu to Seikatsusha.
 shiroato.hp.infoseek.co.jp

Samurai
Japanese warriors killed in battle
1570 deaths
Year of birth unknown